The St. Louis Cardinals 2001 season was the team's 120th season in St. Louis, Missouri and the 110th season in the National League. The Cardinals went 93–69 during the season and finished tied for first in the National League Central division with the Houston Astros. Because the Cardinals and Astros were best two teams in the National League, both from the Central Division, and both finished five games ahead of the third-place Chicago Cubs, the Astros were awarded the NL Central champion and the number 1 seed in the playoffs due to winning the season series 9–7, and the Cardinals were seeded as the wild-card.

In the playoffs the Cardinals lost to the eventual World Champion Arizona Diamondbacks 3 games to 2 in the NLDS.

Third baseman/Outfielder Albert Pujols won the Rookie of the Year Award this year, batting .329, with 37 home runs and 130 RBIs. Second baseman Fernando Viña and outfielder Jim Edmonds won Gold Gloves in 2001.

This was also Jack Buck's final season as the team's broadcaster.

Offseason
December 22, 2000: Quinton McCracken was signed as a free agent with the St. Louis Cardinals.
January 5, 2001: Bobby Bonilla was signed as a free agent with the St. Louis Cardinals.
January 5, 2001: John Mabry was signed as a free agent with the St. Louis Cardinals.
March 28, 2001: Quinton McCracken was released by the St. Louis Cardinals.

Regular season
Albert Pujols made his major league debut on April 2 against the Colorado Rockies. He appeared in three at-bats and collected one hit.

On September 3, Bud Smith became the ninth Cardinal and eighteenth rookie to hurl a no-hitter.

Season standings

Record vs. opponents

Transactions
April 9, 2001: John Mabry was sent to the Florida Marlins by the St. Louis Cardinals as part of a conditional deal.
June 5, 2001: Dan Haren was drafted by the St. Louis Cardinals in the 2nd round of the 2001 amateur draft. Player signed June 20, 2001.
June 5, 2001: Joe Mather was drafted by the St. Louis Cardinals in the 3rd round of the 2001 amateur draft.
June 5, 2001: Skip Schumaker was drafted by the St. Louis Cardinals in the 5th round of the 2001 amateur draft.

Roster

Player stats

Batting

Starters by position 
Note: Pos = Position; G = Games played; AB = At bats; H = Hits; Avg. = Batting average; HR = Home runs; RBI = Runs batted in

Other batters 
Note: G = Games played; AB = At bats; H = Hits; Avg. = Batting average; HR = Home runs; RBI = Runs batted in

Pitching

Starting pitchers 
Note: G = Games pitched; IP = Innings pitched; W = Wins; L = Losses; ERA = Earned run average; SO = Strikeouts

Other pitchers 
Note: G = Games pitched; IP = Innings pitched; W = Wins; L = Losses; ERA = Earned run average; SO = Strikeouts

Relief pitchers 
Note: G = Games pitched; W = Wins; L = Losses; SV = Saves; ERA = Earned run average; SO = Strikeouts

NLDS

Arizona wins the series, 3-2

Awards and honors
 Jim Edmonds, OF, Gold Glove Award
 Albert Pujols, 3B, National League Rookie of the Year Award
 Fernando Viña, 2B, Gold Glove Award

All-Star Game
 Matt Morris, P, reserve
 Albert Pujols, 3B, reserve

Farm system

References

External links

2001 St. Louis Cardinals at Baseball Reference
2001 St. Louis Cardinals team page at www.baseball-almanac.com

St. Louis Cardinals seasons
St Louis